Stoycho Dragov (born 30 August 1968) is a Bulgarian former professional footballer who played as a goalkeeper. He was a squad member for the 1987 FIFA World Youth Championship.

Honours
Slavia Sofia
Bulgarian League: 1995–96
Bulgarian Cup: 1995–96

References

1968 births
Living people
Bulgarian footballers
Bulgaria youth international footballers
PFC Beroe Stara Zagora players
PFC Slavia Sofia players
First Professional Football League (Bulgaria) players
Association football goalkeepers
People from Stara Zagora Province